The Samsung SGH-U700, also known as the Ultra Edition 12.1, is a mobile telephone produced by Samsung Electronics.

Features 
The phone has features including:
 Quad-band capabilities, allowing it to be used as a mobile phone on all major GSM networks across the globe.
 Built in hands-free function.
 Built in Bluetooth wireless technology.
 Custom animated backgrounds (varies with country of sale).
 Memory card slot for optional MicroSD memory card up to 2GB (2 GB only with the latest firmware)
 40 MB internal memory.
 MP3 Ringtones.
 Speakerphone.
 Digital audio player.
 3.2 Megapixel digital camera with many shooting modes and an integrated LED photo/video light (flash), autofocus, and the ability to perform basic image editing functions.
 MPEG-4, 3gp video recording CIF 176*144.
 Java games.
 Alarm clock with three configurable alarms.
 Calendar.
 Calculator.
The slider can be configured to accept and close calls, as well as locking and unlocking the keypad. Settings are available which allow for the phone to stay unlocked even when closed.

See also
Samsung U600
Samsung U900 Soul
Samsung D900

References 

Samsung mobile phones
Mobile phones introduced in 2010